Robin "Bob" F. Schoolley-West (born 12 December 1937, Brighton, died 14 July 2012, Dartford, Kent) was a former Head of the Philatelic Collections at the British Library (originally part of the British Museum).

He joined the Museum in 1973 after he investigated, as a police officer, the theft of items from the philatelic collections by James Mackay. In the mid-1980s he took an active part in tracking down forgeries of classic stamps made by Pro-Phila Forum in Germany based on photographs taken by a visitor to the Library.

Schoolley-West retired in 1991 and was succeeded at the British Library by his former assistant, David Beech.

References

Publications
Stamps, British Library, London, 1987. 
The Care and Preservation of Philatelic Materials, British Library, London, 1989. (With T.J. Collings) 

Employees of the British Library
Metropolitan Police officers
2012 deaths
British philatelists
Year of birth unknown
Fellows of the Royal Philatelic Society London
British Library Philatelic Collections
1937 births